Ciudad Hidalgo is a city in the Mexican state of Chiapas. It serves as the municipal seat of the surrounding municipality of Suchiate which is the southernmost in Mexico. In the 2010 INEGI Census, it reported a population of 14,606 inhabitants. 

It is the main crossing point on the international border with  Guatemala. The Puente Rodolfo Robles, a road-rail bridge, over the Río Suchiate joins it with the Guatemalan city of Ciudad Tecún Umán in the municipality of Ayutla, San Marcos department.

History
Ciudad Hidalgo was founded in 1882 by a group of settlers from Ayutla, San Marcos, who did not wish to remain on the Guatemalan side of the border following adoption of the border treaty of 27 September 1882 between the nations. The new settlement arose on what had been a hacienda called Los Cerros; it was known as either  Suchiate, after the Río Suchiate, or Ignacio Mariscal, after a local landowner. On 4 July 1925 Suchiate was given village (pueblo) status and the municipality of Suchiate was formed. On 24 July 1952, under Governor Francisco J. Grajales, the town of Suchiate was given city status and its name changed to Ciudad Hidalgo, in honour of Fr. Miguel Hidalgo y Costilla.

See also 
 Port Chiapas
 Rail transport in Mexico
 Rail transport in Guatemala

References

Populated places in Chiapas
Guatemala–Mexico border crossings